The Dent de Jaman is a mountain (1875 m) above Montreux, situated north of the Rochers de Naye.

References

External links
Dent de Jaman on Hikr

Bernese Alps
Mountains of Switzerland
Mountains of the Alps
Mountains of the canton of Vaud
One-thousanders of Switzerland